Tewhida Ben Sheikh (also Tawhida Ben Cheikh, Taouhida Ben Cheikh) (January 2, 1909 in Tunis – December 6, 2010) was the first modern Tunisian woman to become a physician. She was also a pioneer in women's medicine, in particular contraception and abortion access.

Early years

Tewhida Ben Sheikh was born in Tunis, Tunisia. Her early education was at Tunisia's first public school for Muslim girls, which was established by "Tunisian nationalists and liberal French protectorate authorities". While attending this school, Ben Sheikh was taught Arabic, French, the study of the Qur'an, and modern subjects.  She travelled to the School of Medicine,  to pursue her education, earning a degree in medicine in 1936. Upon her return to Tunis, she was given a dinner in her honour by local doctors.

Tunisia was a French protectorate at the time. Ben Sheikh came from an elite Tunisian family which was socially conservative, and her widowed mother was reluctant to allow her to go to France after secondary school; however, her secondary school instructors and a doctor from the Louis Pasteur Institute of Tunis (Dr. Etienne Burnet), persuaded Ben Sheikh's mother that she showed significant promise.

Professional achievements
Specializing in gynecology, Ben Sheikh directed a women's clinic in Tunisia. Ben Sheikh was an "active" supporter of family planning; in the 1960s and 1970s, she instructed doctors in abortion procedures.

Legacy
In March 2020, Dr. Ben Sheikh featured on the new 10-dinar banknote issued by the Central Bank of Tunisia.

On 27 March 2021, Google celebrated her with a Google Doodle.

See also

Birth control
Women in medicine
Women in Tunisia

References

1909 births
2010 deaths
People from Tunis
Reproductive rights activists
Abortion-rights activists
Tunisian women physicians
Tunisian gynaecologists
Tunisian women activists
Tunisian women
Tunisian centenarians
Women centenarians